The Laurence Olivier Award for Outstanding Achievement in a Musical was an annual award presented by the Society of London Theatre in recognition of achievements in commercial London theatre. The awards were established as the Society of West End Theatre Awards in 1976, and renamed in 1984 in honour of English actor and director Laurence Olivier.

This award was introduced in 1981, was also presented in 1982 and 1984, then was retired.

Winners and nominees

1980s

See also
 Drama Desk Award for Unique Theatrical Experience
 Tony Honors for Excellence in Theatre

References

External links
 

Laurence Olivier Awards